Northern Maori was one of New Zealand's four original parliamentary Māori electorates established in 1868, along with Eastern Maori, Western Maori and Southern Maori. In 1996, with the introduction of MMP, the Maori electorates were updated, and Northern Maori was replaced with the Te Tai Tokerau electorate.

Population centres

The electorate included the following population centres: Auckland, Whangarei.

Tribal areas

The electorate included the following tribal areas:

History
The Northern Maori electorate boundary was in South Auckland. It extended from Auckland City north to Northland, and had only minor boundary changes from 1868 to 1996.

The first member of parliament for Northern Maori from 1868 was Frederick Nene Russell; he retired in 1870. The second member of parliament from 1871 to 1875 and in 1887 was Wi Katene.

In the  there was some doubt about the validity of the election result, and a law was passed to confirm the result in Northern Maori and two other electorates.

The electorate was held by Labour from 1938. Paraire Karaka Paikea died in 1943, and was replaced by his son Tapihana Paraire Paikea.

In 1979, Matiu Rata resigned from the Labour Party as a protest against Labour policies. In 1980 he resigned from Parliament, but came second in the subsequent by-election. The by-election was won by the Labour candidate, Bruce Gregory.

Tau Henare won the electorate from Gregory for New Zealand First in 1993; a foretaste of the success of Henare and the other New Zealand First candidates (known as the Tight Five) in the Māori electorates in 1996. In 1996 with MMP, the Northern Maori electorate was replaced by Te Tai Tokerau, and won by Henare.

Tau Henare is a great-grandson of Taurekareka Henare who had held the electorate for the Reform Party from 1914 to 1938.

Members of Parliament
The Northern Maori electorate was represented by 15 Members of Parliament:

Key

Election results
Note that the affiliation of many early candidates is not known.

1980 by-election

1963 by-election

1943 election
There were nine candidates in 1943, with the election won by Tapihana Paraire Paikea over Eru Moka Pou.

1931 election

1909 by-election

1901 by-election

1899 election

1891 by-election

1896 election

 
 
 
 

Table footnotes:

1890 election

Notes

References

Historical Māori electorates
1996 disestablishments in New Zealand
1868 establishments in New Zealand